Lost and Lonesome Recording Co. (often simply Lost and Lonesome) is an Australian independent record label founded by Mark Monnone of The Lucksmiths in 1997, based in Melbourne, Australia. The label specialises in indie pop, and has released both recordings by local artists and local releases by international indie bands.

Roster 
Artists who have released recordings on Lost & Lonesome include:

 The Aislers Set
 The Bank Holidays
 Cryptacize
 The Curtains
 The Foots
 Hellogoodbye
 Je Suis Animal
 Lacto-Ovo
 The Ladybug Transistor
 Last Leaves
 Lowtide
 The Lucksmiths
 Mid-State Orange
 The Mosquitoes
 The Pains of Being Pure at Heart
 The Salteens
 Sleepy Township
 The Smallgoods
 Kirsty Stegwazi
 Still Flyin'
 The Zebras

See also 
 List of record labels

External links
 Official site
 MySpace site

Australian independent record labels
Indie pop record labels
Record labels established in 1997